Winulta was a town in the Australian state of South Australia on northern Yorke Peninsula around 10 km from Clinton on the Clinton-Maitland road. It was first settled for farming around 1876. The earliest farmers were William Short, Thomas Kenny and John Sharrad.

The nearby "Hundred of Tiparra School" opened in 1884, was renamed "Winulta School" in 1891 and closed in 1950.

Winulta is located within the federal division of Grey, the state electoral district of Narungga and the local government area of the Yorke Peninsula Council.

See also
List of cities and towns in South Australia

References

External links
  Yorke Peninsula website

Towns in South Australia
Yorke Peninsula